The 1960 NC State Wolfpack football team represented North Carolina State University during the 1960 NCAA University Division football season. The Wolfpack were led by seventh-year head coach Earle Edwards and played their home games at Riddick Stadium in Raleigh, North Carolina. They competed as members of the Atlantic Coast Conference, finishing in second.

Schedule

References

NC State
NC State Wolfpack football seasons
NC State Wolfpack football